The Koala Brothers is a British-Australian stop-motion animated children's television show that features the adventures of 2 koala brothers named Frank and Buster, as they seek to help their friends in a sleepy town in the Australian outback. Seventy-nine episodes were produced over 3 seasons.

A notable quality of the TV show is that although there can be differences of opinion and some instances of anti-social or unthoughtful behaviour, there are no villains or antagonistic characters. Rather, the emphasis is on helping and being a good friend.

The series originally premiered on CBeebies on 1 September 2003 until the final episode's airing on 31 October 2007.

Format
Broadcast episode formats vary slightly between countries, though the main material of each episode, with the titular characters assisting one of their friends and overcoming a problem, such as jealousy, fear, or the failure to share, does not change. In Australia, the show runs in episodes of around 12 minutes' length, though these are broadcast in pairs on ABC Kids, with the opening song "Call the Koala Brothers" repeated in instrumental form over the credits. CBeebies eliminates the introduction and closing song to squeeze the program into a 10-minute format.

In the 30-minute broadcast version, the show opens with a slightly longer version of the theme song and then before each segment, the narrator introduces Frank and Buster as they fly in their yellow two-seater propeller airplane above the outback. The supporting cast is introduced as the narrator asks, "Who do you think the Koala Brothers are going to help today?", followed by Frank's telescope showing the character they're going to help in each respective segment. Each 30-minute episode ends with "The Helping Song", in which all the characters gather at the Koala Brothers' homestead and sing about always trying to help and care for one another.

Inspiration
The show remarkably resembles, in visual style and ethos, a children's book and TV show proposal entitled "The Great Wungle Bungle Aerial Expedition", which featured characters specifically dubbed "The Koala Brothers" and focusing on the adventures of altruistic animal outback aviator rescuers in homemade flying contraptions at a comical desert airstrip, rescuing others or helping out friends with no thought of personal reward. The book first appeared along with accompanying specially designed animatronic character props at the "FirstState88" NSW Govt exhibition in Darling Harbour in Sydney as part of the Australian Bicentenary in 1988. The original three "Koala Brothers" characters first appeared here as supporting characters.

In the 1990s, the book and exhibit's creator Greg McKee revised the concept as an animated TV show proposal called "Echidna Airways" which circulated at Cannes. Greg pitched the proposal to the producers of this show, who ultimately decided to develop their own version of the premise instead. The animation style itself is reminiscent of the popular children's series Bob the Builder with production credits evidently shared between the two.
Archival footage of the Echidna Airways characters and flying machines is viewable here:

Ownership and distribution
The show was purchased by Spellbound Entertainment and was pre-sold to CBeebies for a 2003 delivery. Spellbound would continue to sell the series worldwide until filing for liquidation in 2013. David Johnson, the show's creator, would purchase the rights to the series in February 2014 under a new joint-venture company called Koala Brothers Ltd. Union Media was signed as the new distributor for the series.

Characters
All the characters are anthropomorphic native Australian animals mainly speaking with correct accents, with the notable exceptions of Archie the Crocodile, who speaks in a British accent and Penny the Penguin, who only communicates through penguin sounds.

Main
Frank the Koala (voiced by Keith Wickham) is the male pilot of the airplane. Frank has demonstrated excellent skills in tennis and was the only member of the community able to defeat Archie, though Frank admitted it was probably just luck. Frank also fostered an interest in pottery at one point but did not have any great artistic ability.

Buster the Koala (voiced by Rob Rackstraw) sits behind Frank in the airplane and uses his telescope to spot friends in need from the air. Buster is always willing to provide a pep talk or a hug to his friends. Buster speaks more softly than Frank and has a small tuft of hair on the top of his head. Buster loves to bake, especially butter cookies.

Jonathan Coleman is the Narrator.

Supporting
Mitzi the Possum (voiced by Lucinda Cowden) almost singularly wears flip flops exposing her toes (which implies an attachment though it is not brought up in stories) along with thick-rimmed glasses. Mitzi lives in part of the Koala Brothers' homestead made over as her living quarters and is young and impressionable, often relying on the Koala Brothers to keep in line with her perfection-seeking impulses. Mitzi can get bossy and upset her friends at times, but she means no harm and her friends always forgive her as she is still working out her limits. A recurring sight-gag shows Mitzi slipping out of either or both her flip flops due to being constantly on the go.
Ned the Wombat (voiced by Janet James) is apparently the youngest male member of the local community and lives in a caravan next door to the Koala Brothers' homestead. Ned is often not sure of himself, but dreams of adventure and longs to be a hero like his idols Frank and Buster. Ned is very determined and easily fixated on an idea, and often will come through with prompting.
George the Turtle (voiced by Rob Rackstraw) is the local mail carrier. George has no established residence but is always seen delivering the mail with his trusty leather satchel. George is very proud of being a mail carrier and tells the best campfire stories in the outback. George also has an interest in stamp collecting.
Sammy the Echidna (voiced by Rob Rackstraw) lives in town and owns the local general store, which sells fuel in addition to comestibles. His only employee is Josie. As one of the more senior citizens, Sammy has the fewest problems after the Koala Brothers.
Josie the Kangaroo (voiced by Janet James) works at the general store with Sammy. Josie is shy, and wears a small red and white striped shirt that exposes her bright yellow tummy, a blue skirt with a deep pocket and shoes. She and Mitzi are the best of friends.
Alice the Platypus (voiced by Lucinda Cowden) works at the local café and appears to be the lone employee, though it is unclear if Alice owns the café. Alice is very forgetful. She rides a green motor scooter around, which has its share of drastic engine problems. Alice loves to bake and is good at following recipes. Alice is also good at reading maps.
Archie the Crocodile (voiced by Keith Wickham) lives in a well-appointed cottage near the local water hole. Archie is cheerful and is always exercising, stretching, or playing tennis, and is also renowned at being the best at almost every sport. Archie is British and speaks in a memorable rich accent.
Penny the Penguin (vocal effects provided by Janet James) is a young female explorer who lives in Antarctica but has visited the outback on certain occasions and keeps up a regular written correspondence with the Koala Brothers. Penny communicates by chattering like a penguin or cooing like an baby and takes part in singing "The Helping Song".
Lolly the Emu (voiced by Lucinda Cowden) is the female local ice cream vendor and can often be seen driving her ice cream truck around the Outback. Lolly greets people by saying "How can I cool you down?"

Episodes

Series overview

Series 1 (2003–04)

Series 2 (2004–05)

Series 3 (2005–07)

Telecast and home media
Originally aired on ABC Kids from 2003 until 2007 with repeats until the early-2010s. The show later aired on CBeebies in the United Kingdom and Playhouse Disney in the United States, as well as various foreign stations. As of 2022, the show is now streaming on the premium Amazon Prime.

In the United States, several DVDs of the series were released by Lionsgate Home Entertainment.
DVDs Released in North America:
Meet the Koala Brothers!
A Day in the Outback!
We're Here to Help!
Ned's Buried Treasure
Mitzi's Big Adventure
Outback Christmas (A 50-minute special)

DVDs Released in the United Kingdom:
The Koala Brothers: A Letter for George and Other Stories
The Koala Brothers: Archie's New Home and Other Stories
The Koala Brothers: Ned the Pilot and Other Stories
The Koala Brothers: Alice Can't Remember and Other Stories
The Koala Brothers: Outback Christmas
The Koala Brothers: Mitzi's Day Out and Other Stories
The Koala Brothers: We're Here to Help!

Award nominations
 BAFTA Children's Awards 2006
 Nominated for Best Animation (for the episode "The Koala Brothers Outback Christmas")

References

External links
 
 
 vimeo

2003 British television series debuts
2007 British television series endings
British preschool education television series
Animated preschool education television series
2000s preschool education television series
British children's animated adventure television series
British stop-motion animated television series
Disney Channel original programming
Treehouse TV original programming
BBC children's television shows
Australian Broadcasting Corporation original programming
S4C original programming
Animated television series about brothers
Television series about koalas
Fictional wombats
Television series about kangaroos and wallabies
CBeebies
English-language television shows